Peter Doohan and Brian Levine were the defending champions, but did not participate this year.

Brad Gilbert and Ilie Năstase won the title, defeating Michael Robertson and Florin Segărceanu 6–3, 6–2 in the final.

Seeds

  Shlomo Glickstein /  Shahar Perkiss (semifinals)
  Tracy Delatte /  Mike De Palmer (first round)
  Brad Gilbert /  Ilie Năstase (champions)
  Christo Steyn /  Danie Visser (semifinals)

Draw

Draw

External links
Draw

Tel Aviv Open
1985 Grand Prix (tennis)